Fairfield Township is one of twenty-five townships in Bureau County, Illinois, USA. As of the 2020 census, its population was 379 and it contained 142 housing units.

Geography

Unincorporated towns
 Thomas
 Yorktown

Cemeteries
The township contains three cemeteries:
 Amish
 Anderson Family
 Yorktown

Major highways
  Illinois Route 92

Airports and landing strips
 Lisa Landing Strip

Landmarks
 Hennepin Canal Parkway State Park (north quarter)

Demographics
As of the 2020 census there were 379 people, 114 households, and 106 families residing in the township. The racial makeup of the township was 95.51% White, 0.53% African American, 0.00% Native American, 0.53% Asian, 0.79% Pacific Islander, 0.26% from other races, and 2.37% from two or more races. Hispanic or Latino of any race were 1.06% of the population.

There were 114 households, out of which 45.60% had children under the age of 18 living with them, 82.46% were married couples living together, 10.53% had a female householder with no spouse present, and 7.02% were non-families. 7.00% of all households were made up of individuals, and 7.00% had someone living alone who was 65 years of age or older. The average household size was 4.96 and the average family size was 5.26.

The township's age distribution consisted of 38.5% under the age of 18, 7.2% from 18 to 24, 32.1% from 25 to 44, 15.1% from 45 to 64, and 6.9% who were 65 years of age or older. The median age was 29.2 years. For every 100 females, there were 121.1 males. For every 100 females age 18 and over, there were 66.5 males.

The median income for a household in the township was $78,542, and the median income for a family was $79,375. Males had a median income of $34,531 versus $27,083 for females. The per capita income for the township was $18,520. About 22.6% of families and 33.6% of the population were below the poverty line, including 65.1% of those under age 18 and none of those age 65 or over.

School districts
 Bureau Valley Community Unit School District 340
 Prophetstown-Lyndon-Tampico Community Unit School District 3

Political districts
 Illinois's 14th congressional district
 State House District 74
 State Senate District 37

References
 
 US Census Bureau 2007 TIGER/Line Shapefiles
 United States National Atlas

External links
 City-Data.com
 Illinois State Archives

Townships in Bureau County, Illinois
Populated places established in 1849
Townships in Illinois
1849 establishments in Illinois